Manuel Kubli (born 9 April 1995) is a Swiss footballer who plays for FC Rapperswil-Jona.

References

Swiss men's footballers
Association football midfielders
1995 births
Living people
Grasshopper Club Zürich players
FC Rapperswil-Jona players
Swiss Super League players
Swiss Challenge League players